This is a list of the 1983 PGA Tour Qualifying School graduates. 57 players earned their 1984 PGA Tour card through Q-School in 1983. The tournament was played over 108 holes at the Tournament Players Club in Ponte Vedra, Florida.

Bob Tway shot a final round 81, three-putting the final green to miss earning a card by a stroke.

Sources:

References 

PGA Tour Qualifying School
Golf in Florida
PGA Tour Qualifying School Graduates
PGA Tour Qualifying School Graduates